The Saratov State Medical University (SSMU) (рус. Саратовский государственный медицинский университет им. В. И. Разумовского; Saratov State Medical University named after V.I. Razumovsky; Razumovsky University) is a public university located in Saratov, Saratov Oblast, Russia.

History 

The university was founded in 1909 as Imperial University by the Decree of Emperor Nicholas II. On June 10, 1909, the Emperor signed the "Decree on the foundation of the university in Saratov", which became the tenth University in Russia and consisted of the Medical Faculty only. Professor V.I. Razumovsky became the first university rector. In 1930, the Medical Faculty of Saratov University was transformed into an independent institution of higher education, which was known as the Medical Institute.

In 1993, it received the status of a Medical University. In 2009, the university was named after its first rector Vasily Ivanovich Razumovsky.

Such outstanding Russian scientists as Prof. A. Bogomolets, Prof. S. Spasokukotsky, Prof. S. Mirotvortsev, Prof. K. Tretiakoff, L. Leitman (the world's first female professor of forensic medicine) provided students with the knowledge in the SSMU.

In 2019, the university was ranked in the top 50 universities in Russia by Forbes.

In 2021, it was ranked in the top 300 universities in the world for Good health and well-being by Times Higher Education.

Faculties 
 Faculty of General Medicine
 Faculty of Pediatrics
 Faculty of Dentistry
 Faculty of Medical and Preventative Care
 Faculty of Pharmacy
 Faculty of Clinical Psychology
 Nursing Institute
 Faculty of Vocational Training and Professional Retraining of Specialists

Departments 
 Obstetrics and Gynecology
 Obstetrics and Gynecology Faculty of Medicine
 Obstetrics and Gynecology of the Faculty of Pediatrics
 Human anatomy
 Biochemistry and clinical laboratory diagnostics
 Hygiene of the Medical and Preventive Faculty
 Histology
 Ophthalmology 
 Hospital Pediatrics and Neonatology
 Hospital Therapy Faculty of Medicine
 Hospital Surgery Medical Faculty
 Dermatovenereology and cosmetology
 Children's diseases of the medical faculty
 Foreign languages
 Infectious diseases
 Infectious diseases in children and outpatient pediatrics named after N. R. Ivanova
 Clinical immunology and allergology
 Therapeutic exercise sports medicine and physiotherapy
 Radiation Diagnostics and Radiation Therapy named after Professor N. E. Stern
 Medical Biophysics named after Professor V. D. Zernov
 Microbiology, virology and immunology
 Mobilization training of healthcare and disaster medicine
 Neurology them. K. N. Tretyakova
 Neurosurgery
 Normal Physiology named after I. A. Chuevsky
 General biology, pharmacognosy and botany
 General hygiene and ecology
 General surgery
 General, bioorganic and pharmaceutical chemistry
 Public Health and Health (with courses in jurisprudence and medical history)
 Operative surgery and topographic anatomy
 Otorhinolaryngology
 Pathological anatomy
 Pathological physiology named after Academician A. A. Bogomolets
 Pedagogy, educational technology and professional communication
 Pediatrics
 Polyclinic therapy, general medical practice and preventive medicine
 Propaedeutics of internal diseases
 Propaedeutics of childhood diseases, pediatric endocrinology and diabetology
 Propaedeutics of dental diseases
 Occupational pathology, hematology and clinical pharmacology
 Psychiatry, narcology, psychotherapy and clinical psychology
 Russian and Latin
 Emergency emergency anesthesiology and resuscitation care and simulation technologies in medicine
 Pediatric dentistry and orthodontics
 Orthopedic dentistry
 Therapeutic dentistry
 Dental surgery and maxillofacial surgery
 Forensic medicine named after Professor M. I. Raysky
 Therapies with courses in cardiology, functional diagnostics and geriatrics
 Therapy, gastroenterology and pulmonology
 Traumatology and orthopedics
 Urology
 Faculty of Pediatrics
 Faculty Therapy Faculty of Medicine
 Faculty of Surgery and oncology
 Pharmacology
 Pharmaceutical technology and biotechnology
 Physical education
 Philosophy, humanities and psychology
 Phthisiology
 Phthisiopulmonology
 Pediatric surgery
 Surgery and oncology
 Economics and management of health care and pharmacy
 Endocrinology
 Epidemiology

Specialists at research and development institutes, centres, laboratories, museums, and innovation groups at Saratov State Medical University conduct fundamental and applied scientific research. Among them are the Research Institute of Basic and Clinical Uro-Nephrology, the Central Research Laboratory, the Scientific Educational Centre for Fundamental Medicine and Nanotechnologies, the Medical Technopark, the University Publishing House, the Scientific Medical Library, the Museum of University History, and many other university divisions. Around 7000 students graduate from the university each year.

Governance 
The university is nominally led by a Rector, who is the titular head of the university and is normally a well-known public figure. The day-to-day chief executive role is the responsibility of the Prorector, a full-time academic post. The senior management board of the university is headed by the Prorector, assisted by Deans. It is responsible for the day-to-day management of the university.

Student life 
The Trade Union secures that social and working rights of students are protected. The Trade Union engages in a range of activities: sport and wellness, information analysis, culture and entertainment, as well as community service (work with children left without parental or guardian care).

The Student Club runs over ten clubs. The university stand-up comedy teams are the winners of the regional Stand-Up Comedy League. The Student Folk Anatomical Theatre participates in various Russian theatre contests and performs in the university and on the stage of the Saratov Kiselev Academic Youth Theatre.

Notable people

Rectors of the Saratov State Medical University 
 Razumovsky Vasily Ivanovich (1909-1912)
 Chuevsky Ivan Afanasyevich (1912-1912)
 Stadnitsky Nikolai Grigorievich (1912-1913)
 Zabolotnov Pyotr Pavlovich (1914-1918)
 Arnoldov Vladimir Andreevich (1918-1918)
 Zernov Vladimir Dmitrievich (1918-1920)
 Golubev Vladimir Vasilyevich (1920-1922)
 Mirotvortsev Sergei Romanovich (1923-1928)
 Katsenbogen (1928-1931)
 Shkhvatsabaia Konstantin Yakovlevich (1931-1935)
 I.A. Arnoldi (1935-1937)
 IAroslavtsev Alexander Leontievich (April 1937 - December 1937)
 Samoilova Elena Evgenievna (1937-1938)
 V.N. Abramenko (1938-1940)
 Rapoport Pavel Lvovich (1940-1942)
 Bogoslovsky Ivan Trofimovich (1943-1948)
 Popov'ian Ivan Minaevich (1948-1953)
 Nikitin Boris Andreevich (1953-1960)
 Ivanov Nikolai Romanovich (1960-1989)
 Kirichuk Vyacheslav Fedorovich (1989-1997)
 Goremykin Vladimir Ilyich (1997-2002)
 Glybochko Pyotr Vitalievich (2002-2010)
 Popkov Vladimir Mikhailovich (2010-2020)
 Eremin Andrey Vyacheslavovich (September 2020 – Present)

Notable academics 

 A.A. Bogomolets
 S.I. Spasokukotsky
 S.R. Mirotvortsev
 K.N. Tretiakoff

References 

Buildings and structures in Saratov
Universities in Volga Region
Universities established in the 19th century
Medical schools in Russia
Education in Saratov